Ma Mingzhe (born 1955) is a Chinese businessman who serves as the  chairman of Ping An Insurance.

Biography
Ma Mingzhe (Chinese: 马明哲; born 1955) co-founded Ping An Insurance  in 1988 as China’s first joint-stock insurer, and the company has grown into a financial group covering insurance, banking and investment services.  In June 2020, Ma has stepped down as chief executive and remained as chairman of the company.

Ma opened the doors of Ping An to foreign investors including HSBC, Morgan Stanley and Goldman Sachs. His company was one of the earliest companies to launch a successful float on a huge scale in Hong Kong. The Times calls him "a seasoned infighter who engineered the emergence of Ping An as an independent insurer from its earlier domination by the Chinese state banks, which were its principal shareholders."

He was named 3rd on Forbes China’s 2020 ranking of China’s best 50 CEOs.

Career and Education

Founding of Ping An Insurance and early career
Ma has worked in the insurance industry for his entire career. In the mid-1980s, Ma worked as a young assistant manager at China Merchants Group’s social security office in Shenzhen’s Shekou district. He persuaded senior executive Yuan Geng, who later retired as group vice chairman, to allow him to explore the possibility of helping the state-owned trading house set up an insurance unit. Ma then steered China Merchants’ entry into the insurance business, establishing Ping An, China’s first life insurer modeled after the West, in 1988.
Ma recruited insurance industry executives from Taiwan and Hong Kong, bringing them to Shekou, then a burgeoning port district of Shenzhen, to help him set up an insurance company modeled on those in the West.
In his book, Ping’an Xin Yu, or “Ping An’s Language of the Heart,” Ma presents a collection of essays about the firm’s history, written by him and his team. They recount how they created modern insurance sales and management strategies tailor-made for China. The book references Confucius as the individual who embodies the best of traditional Chinese philosophers and Albert Einstein as the best in Western scientific philosophy. 

Ma received his doctorate and is a member of the Chinese Communist Party.

Philanthropy

In 2007, Ma Mingzhe and his family donated RMB 20 million (USD 2.66 million) to set up the Mingyuan Foundation under the China Soong Ching Ling Foundation. The donation increased to RMB 100 million (USD 13.3 million) in 2012 

In 2017, Ma Mingzhe visited the first Ping An Hope Primary School in Lu’an, Anhui Province, where the group first started its “Teaching Volunteers Program”, to show support for this worthy cause.

In 2020, Ping An Insurance and Chairman Ma personally donated a batch of anti-epidemic materials to Indonesia in a total value of USD 1.5 million (about RMB 10 million). 
The group and Chairman Ma also donated medical supplies worth more than RMB 10 million to the UK., including 100,000 surgical masks and gloves, 10,000 goggles and hand sanitizers, 10,000 masks and diagnostic test kits for COVID-19, 4,000 sets of protective clothing, 15 respirators, and 1,000 sets of medical equipment including the COVID-19 smart image-reading system developed by Ping An.

References

1955 births
Living people
Ping An Insurance people
Chinese chief executives
Zhongnan University of Economics and Law alumni
20th-century Chinese businesspeople
21st-century Chinese businesspeople